Skalino is a rural locality (a station) in Rostilovskoye Rural Settlement, Gryazovetsky District, Vologda Oblast, Russia. The population was 10 as of 2002.

Geography 
The distance to Gryazovets is 45 km, to Rostilovo is 29 km. Vislyakovo is the nearest rural locality.

References 

Rural localities in Gryazovetsky District